Fethiye is a city and district of Muğla Province, Turkey.

Fethiye may also refer to:

People
 Fethiye Çetin (born 1950), Turkish lawyer

Places
 Gulf of Fethiye, a gulf of the Mediterranean Sea
 Fethiye, Kazan, a village and neighborhood in the district of Kazan, Ankara Province, Turkey
 Fethiye, Yenişehir

Mosques
 Fethiye Mosque (disambiguation)

Other
 Fethiyespor, Turkish football club based in the city
 Fethiye Museum, Istanbul

Turkish feminine given names